Michael Paul Mills (born August 25, 1956) is an American lawyer and jurist serving as a senior United States district judge of the United States District Court for the Northern District of Mississippi.

Early life and education

Mills was born on August 25, 1956 in Charleston, South Carolina. He received an Associate of Arts from Itawamba Community College in 1976, a Bachelor of Arts from the University of Mississippi in 1978, a Juris Doctor from the University of Mississippi School of Law in 1980, and a Master of Laws from the University of Virginia School of Law in 2001.

Career 
From 1980 to 1995 he engaged in the private practice of law in Mississippi. He was a member of the Mississippi House of Representatives from 1984 to 1995, and served as a justice of the Mississippi Supreme Court from 1995 to 2001.

In addition to his work as a lawyer and judge, Mills published a collection of short stories titled Twice Told Tombigbee Tales.

Federal judicial service 
On September 4, 2001, Mills was nominated by President George W. Bush to a seat on the United States District Court for the Northern District of Mississippi vacated by Judge Neal B. Biggers. Mills was confirmed by the United States Senate in a 98–0 vote on October 11, 2001, and received his commission on October 16, 2001. He became chief judge in 2007, and served in that capacity until 2014, when he was succeeded by Sharion Aycock. He assumed senior status on November 1, 2021.

Personal life 
Mills and his wife, Jada, have two sons. Jada is a biology instructor at Itawamba  Community College.

References

External links

1956 births
Living people
21st-century American judges
Judges of the United States District Court for the Northern District of Mississippi
Justices of the Mississippi Supreme Court
Lawyers from Charleston, South Carolina
Members of the Mississippi House of Representatives
United States district court judges appointed by George W. Bush
University of Mississippi alumni
University of Mississippi School of Law alumni
University of Virginia School of Law alumni